Kinord Castle, also known as Loch Kinord Castle, was a 14th-century castle on Castle Island in Loch Kinord to the south of Old Kinord, Aberdeenshire, Scotland.

History
First mentioned in 1335, when supporters of David de Strathbogie sought refuge after the battle of Culblean. The castle is mentioned further in 1505 and was used by the Alexander Gordon, Earl of Huntly as a mansion in 1511. Restored and garrisoned in 1646, the castle was razed by an act of Parliament in 1648.

Slight traces of the castle are visible above ground.

References

External links
Castle Island, Loch Kinord—Royal Commission on the Ancient and Historical Monuments of Scotland listing

History of Aberdeenshire
Castles in Aberdeenshire
Former castles in Scotland